Bloom is a test to measure the strength of a gel or gelatin. The test was originally developed and patented in 1925 by Oscar T. Bloom. The test determines the weight in grams needed by a specified plunger (normally with a diameter of 0.5 inch) to depress the surface of the gel by 4 mm without breaking it at a specified temperature. The number of grams is called the Bloom value, and most gelatins are between 30 and 300 g Bloom. The higher a Bloom value, the higher the melting and gelling points of a gel, and the shorter its gelling times.  This method is most often used on soft gels. To perform the Bloom test on gelatin, a 6.67% gelatin solution is kept for 17–18 hours at 10 °C prior to being tested.

Various gelatins are categorized as "low Bloom", "medium Bloom", or "high Bloom", but there are not universally defined specific values for these subranges. Gelatin is a biopolymer material composed of polypeptide chains of varying length. The longer the chain, the higher the Bloom number:

See also
 Durometer

References

External links
 

Hardness tests
Gels